Kimsa Qucha (Quechua kimsa three, qucha lake, "three lakes", also spelled Quimsa Khocha) is a mountain in the Bolivian Andes which reaches a height of approximately . It is located in the Chuquisaca Department, Nor Cinti Province, San Lucas Municipality.

References 

Mountains of Chuquisaca Department